Qazi Muhammad Isa (17 July 1914 – 19 June 1976) was a Pakistani politician and one of the leading founding fathers of Pakistan. He was an advocate of the Pakistan Movement and represented Balochistan in the Lahore Conference that lead to the ratification of Lahore Resolution. He was a leader of the Muslim League's branches in Balochistan and NWFP.

Early life and career
Qazi Muhammad Isa was born on 17 July 1914 in Pishin District, Balochistan. He received his basic education in Quetta. In 1933, he went to England for higher studies and received his law degree from Middle Temple, London. After returning to British India, he started practicing law in Bombay in 1938 where he first met Jinnah.

He participated in the formation of the first Muslim political party in Pakistan, (Muslim league) Balochistan before 1947. He was from a Sunni Hazara tribe, Sheikh Ali, which migrated from Kandahar, Afghanistan to Pishin in Balochistan, Pakistan.
 
"After having been called to Bar in January 1939, he returned home and met Quaide-e-Azam Mohammad Ali Jinnah in Bombay. He was so impressed with his ideas and personality that on his return to Balochistan, he founded the All-India Muslim League in his province." He played a key role in the Pakistan Movement and was one of the trusted lieutenants of Muhammad Ali Jinnah. He was the youngest member of the Working Committee of the All-India Muslim League and as President of the Baluchistan Provincial Muslim League, he quickly organized the party throughout the province and played a key role in the 'Vote for Pakistan movement' and in the historical referendum of the then North-West Frontier Province. Qazi Essa travelled more than 300,000 miles to campaign for the Pakistan Movement between 1940 and 1947.

He represented Balochistan in the 1940 Lahore Resolution (Qarardad-e-Lahore قرارداد لاھور), commonly known as the Pakistan Resolution (قرارداد پاکستان Qarardad-e-Pakistan). His nephew, Ashraf Jehangir Qazi, has been a Pakistani High Commissioner in India, Pakistan's Permanent representative in UNO and UN Secretary General Special Representative in Iraq. Qazi Essa's  son Qazi Faez Isa became Chief Justice of Balochistan High Court on 5 August 2009. He later took oath as a Judge of the Supreme Court of Pakistan on 5 September 2014.

Later, Qazi Muhammad Isa served as Ambassador of Pakistan to Brazil from 1951 to 1953. He also was a member of Pakistan delegations to the United Nations in 1950, 1954 and 1974. He was appointed member of the Committee on Minorities in the first Constituent Assembly of Pakistan.

Commemorative postage stamp issued in 1990
 Pakistan Postal Services issued a commemorative postage stamp in Qazi Muhammad Isa's honor in its 'Pioneers of Freedom' series in 1990.

Death and legacy
Qazi Muhammad Isa died on 19 June 1976. Qazi Isa devotedly served the Muslim League for 37 years. Among his survivors are some notable Pakistani personalities. One of them is his son Justice Qazi Faez Isa who is a judge in the Supreme Court of Pakistan and a nephew Ashraf Jehangir Qazi who has held many prominent diplomatic positions in the service of Pakistan.

See also
 All-India Muslim League
 Balochistan
 Lahore Resolution
 Qazi Faez Isa (Justice of Supreme Court of Pakistan and a son of Qazi Mohammad Isa)
 Ashraf Jehangir Qazi (a nephew of Qazi Mohammad Isa)
 History of Quetta

References

Bibliography

 Francis Robinson (1997), The Muslims and Partition, History Today, Vol. 47
 

1914 births
1976 deaths
Pakistani Muslims
People from Quetta
Pakistan Muslim League politicians
All India Muslim League members
Leaders of the Pakistan Movement
Pakistani people of Hazara descent
Hazara people
Hazara politicians
Qazi family
Pakistan Movement activists from Balochistan
Ambassadors of Pakistan to Brazil